Bardeh Rashan may refer to:
 Bardeh Rashan, Mahabad